A submarine is a specialized watercraft that can operate underwater.

Submarine may also refer to:

Underwater, when this means "under the sea"

Film
Submarine films, a war film genre
Submarine (1928 film), an American film directed by Frank Capra
Submarine (2010 film), a British film directed by Richard Ayoade
Submarine (EP), the soundtrack for the 2010 film, written by Alex Turner

Literature
"Submarines" (poem), a 1917 poem and song by Rudyard Kipling
Submarine (Clancy book), a 1993 non-fiction book by Tom Clancy
Submarine (novel), a 2008 novel by Joe Dunthorne, adapted into the 2010 film

Music
Submarine (band), the UK band
The Submarines, an American indie rock band on Nettwerk
Submarine (album), the 1992 debut album of Whipping Boy

Songs
"Submarines" (Elgar)
"Submarines" (The Lumineers song), a song from The Lumineers's 2012 album The Lumineers
"Submarine", a song by Godley & Creme
"Submarine", a song by Genesis Genesis Archive 2: 1976–1992
"Submarine", a song by Björk's 2004 album Medúlla

Other uses
Submarine sandwich
Submarine (arcade game), a 1979 mechanical arcade game
Submarine (baseball), a way of pitching the ball

See also

 
 Semisub
 Submersible boat
 Sub (disambiguation)